Ernest François Fournier (1842–1934) was a French diplomat and admiral born in Toulouse on May 23, 1842. He was a French negotiator in the Tientsin Accord, which resolved the undeclared war between France and China in 1884.

He joined the navy in 1859, and fought in the Franco-Prussian War, seeing action in Battle of Villiers and Fort Rosny. He was also in charge of the French Mediterranean Sea naval squadron from 1898 until 1900.

1842 births
1934 deaths
French diplomats
French Navy admirals
Honorary Knights Grand Cross of the Order of St Michael and St George
Honorary Knights Grand Cross of the Royal Victorian Order